The Airdrome Morane Saulnier L is an American amateur-built aircraft, designed and produced by Airdrome Aeroplanes, of Holden, Missouri. The aircraft is supplied as a kit for amateur construction.

The aircraft is a 3/4 scale replica of the First World War French Morane-Saulnier L fighter, first flown by French aviator Roland Garros to shoot down an enemy aircraft with a forward-firing machine gun in March 1915. The replica is built from modern materials and powered by modern engines.

Design and development
The Airdrome Morane Saulnier L features a parasol wing monoplane layout, a single-seat open cockpit, fixed conventional landing gear and a single engine in tractor configuration.

The aircraft is made from bolted-together aluminum tubing, with its flying surfaces covered in doped aircraft fabric. The kit is made up of twelve sub-kits. The standard engine used is the  Valley Engineering Big Twin four stroke engine. Building time from the factory-supplied kit is estimated at 300 hours by the manufacturer.

Operational history
Two examples had been completed by December 2011.

Specifications (Morane Saulnier L)

References

Homebuilt aircraft
Single-engined tractor aircraft
Parasol-wing aircraft